The 2010 New York Giants season was the 86th season for the team in the National Football League (NFL) and the team's inaugural season in New Meadowlands Stadium. The Giants were looking to improve on their 8–8 finish in 2009 and to return to the playoffs after missing the postseason. Although New York was able to improve on their record and finish 10–6, the team was eliminated from postseason contention on the regular season's final day. 
The Giants dedicated their 2010 season to the memory of Bob Sheppard, the team's public address announcer from 1956 to 2005, who died on July 11, 2010.

Offseason

Transactions
With the upcoming uncapped season in the NFL, several Giants players who expected to become unrestricted free agents will be restricted free agents. The first move of the team in the offseason was to renew some of the contracts of players who were on the practice squad. Also in the beginning of the offseason the team signed three new players: defensive back Courtney Brown, fullback Jerome Johnson and kicker Sam Swank. Swank will provide competition for Lawrence Tynes, the regular kicker of the team. On January 19 the team added tight end Carson Butler who was signed after being dismissed by the Cincinnati Bengals. The Giants continued to add players when on February 8 the team was awarded offensive tackle Herb Taylor via waivers. They released starting inside linebacker and defensive team captain Antonio Pierce on February 11. The team began to offer tenders to their restricted free agents in late February when all of them with the exception of cornerback Kevin Dockery and tight end Darcy Johnson were offered them. On March 5 the Giants made the biggest free agency acquisition of the year so far with the signing of safety Antrel Rolle to a five-year, 37 million dollar contract making him one of the highest paid safeties in NFL history. Following the signing of Rolle the team waived safeties Aaron Rouse and Londen Fryar. In early March the Giants lost their backup quarterback David Carr to the San Francisco 49ers and  veteran defensive tackle Fred Robbins to the St. Louis Rams.

On March 9 the team signed quarterback Jim Sorgi to a one-year deal. Sorgi was the backup for Eli Manning's brother, Peyton, in Indianapolis since 2004 and was released in early March. On March 18 the Giants signed Australian punter Jy Bond. On March 22 the team lost another two players to the St. Louis Rams: tight end Darcy Johnson and cornerback Kevin Dockery signed with the team. On April 1, punter Jeff Feagles signed a one-year deal with the Giants making this his 7th season with the Giants and his 23rd season in the NFL. On the same day the Giants signed free-agent safety Deon Grant and because of it they withdrew the tender they offer to restricted free-agent C.C. Brown. On April 30, punter Jeff Feagles retired from the NFL as one of the greatest punters ever only after a month after renewing his contract. After the Rookie Minicamp, on early May, the Giants signed undrafted linebacker Micah Johnson to fill the 80-men roster for the offseason. On May 7 the team released undrafted quarterback Dominic Randolph and signed Riley Skinner to the spot as the fourth quarterback on the roster. On June 11 the team signed their first rookie, the safety Chad Jones, drafted in the third round of the Draft. To open space in the roster the team released the kicker Sam Swank.

Free agents

2010 NFL Draft

After finishing the 2009 season with an 8–8 record, the Giants hold the 15th selection in the 2010 NFL Draft. The team wasn't awarded with any compensatory pick for the past offseason. In the first round of the Draft, after seeing his top targets being picked by other teams, the Giants selected DE Jason Pierre-Paul with the 15th pick of the round, adding depth to the position. In the second day of the Draft the Giants bolstered even more his defensive line by drafting defensive tackle Linval Joseph with the 46th pick in the second round. Then in the third round, with the pick 76 the Giants drafted safety Chad Jones. In the third and final day of the Draft the team drafted four players. In the fourth round the Giants drafted linebacker Phillip Dillard, supplying the biggest need in the team after the departure of Antonio Pierce. In the fifth round the Giants drafted offensive guard Mitch Petrus, their only offensive player of the whole process. In the sixth round the Giants drafted Adrian Tracy, a versatile player who can play either as defensive end and linebacker. In the final round the team picked punter Matt Dodge after some reports saying that veteran punter Jeff Feagles is in the verge of retiring himself.

Undrafted free agents

Following the 2010 NFL Draft the New York Giants signed with twelve undrafted free agents. They were:

Roster

Staff

Staff changes
On January 4, 2010, the Giants fired first-year defensive coordinator Bill Sheridan after the Giants defense slipped as the team dropped 8 of their last 11 games and allowed 40 points on five occasions. On January 14 the team signed Perry Fewell, former interim head coach of the Buffalo Bills.
On January 6, 2010, the Giants fired defensive line coach Mike Waufle, after a disappointing season by the Giants defensive line. On January 27 the team hired Robert Nunn to the position. Nunn was working as co-defensive line coach at the Tampa Bay Buccaneers.
On January 29, 2010 the Giants quarterbacks coach Chris Palmer retired from the NFL to become the new head coach of the Hartford Colonials in the UFL. On February 12 the team moved wide receivers coach Mike Sullivan to quarterbacks coach.
On February 12, 2010 the Giants moved wide receivers coach Mike Sullivan to quarterbacks coach. With this the team promoted offensive quality control coach Sean Ryan to the position.
On February 22, 2010 the Giants hired Kevin Gilbride, Jr. to offensive quality control coach.

Staff

Schedule

Preseason
The Giants preseason schedule was announced on March 31, 2010. The exact dates and times of the remaining preseason games were announced on April 20, together with the regular season schedule.

Regular season

The Giants' 2010 schedule was announced on April 20, 2010.

COLOR KEY & NOTES:

Bold indicates division games.
 Indicates that the game time was rescheduled from December 12 to December 13 and moved to Ford Field in Detroit due to inclement weather and the roof collapse of the Hubert H. Humphrey Metrodome.

Standings

Regular season results

Week 1: vs. Carolina Panthers

The Giants opened their new home in search of revenge against the Panthers, who had soundly defeated them in the last game at Giants Stadium. In the first quarter, Carolina scored the stadium's first points as kicker John Kasay got a 21-yard field goal. New York would answer with the stadium's first touchdown as quarterback Eli Manning found wide receiver Hakeem Nicks from 26 yards out. The Panthers would retake the lead in the second quarter as Kasay made field goals from 52 and 43 yards. Manning found Nicks again on a 19-yard touchdown pass with less than a minute left in the first half, but Carolina quarterback Matt Moore completed a 19-yard touchdown pass to wide receiver Steve Smith with six seconds remaining.

The Giants would get back on top in the third quarter as kicker Lawrence Tynes nailed a 32-yard field goal, followed by Nicks' third touchdown of the game (a 6-yard catch). In the fourth quarter, the Giants added one more touchdown as running back Ahmad Bradshaw ran for a 4-yard score. Carolina's Greg Hardy blocked a Matt Dodge punt out of the end zone to round out the scoring with a safety.

The Giants' historic win had come with a price, however; tight end Kevin Boss left the game in the first quarter with a concussion, and Will Beatty, who filled in for Boss afterward, was benched with a broken foot. The Giants signed tight end Bear Pascoe from their practice squad to play against the Colts.

Week 2: at Indianapolis Colts

The second "Manning Bowl" was only the second time in NFL history that two brothers started opposite each other at quarterback, in a game which was expected to be an offensive struggle between Eli and his older brother Peyton. But the Giants didn't seem to have an answer for Peyton or the Colts' running game, which was led by Joseph Addai and Donald Brown.

The Giants were shut out at the half for the third time in their last four games (dating back to last year) after the Colts scored the first 24 points of the night. Brown recorded a 7-yard scoring run, and Dallas Clark and Austin Collie caught touchdown passes of 50 and 3 yards, respectively. The Colts defense held the Giants to 75 yards of offense in the first half, including just 17 passing yards for Eli. The Giants finally got on the board on the first drive of the second half, when Eli connected with Mario Manningham for a 54-yard strike. But on the Giants' next drive, an Eli fumble was picked up in the end zone by Fili Moala, effectively taking the Giants out of the game. Two additional scores occurred in the fourth quarter; Peyton connected with Reggie Wayne for a 10-yard score, and Eli threw a 31-yard touchdown to Week 1 star Nicks.

On a night when almost nothing went right for the Giants, Brandon Jacobs caused a stir by throwing his helmet into the stands in the third quarter, which he later claimed was a botched expression of frustration. The NFL fined Jacobs $10,000 for the incident.

Week 3: vs. Tennessee Titans
 
Giants miscues were the story of this game; as head coach Tom Coughlin would later comment, "[T]he first thing you have to do is keep from beating yourself before you can beat the opponent and we didn't do that." The Giants accumulated 417 yards of offense, including 26 first downs, but scored only twice on 8 trips inside Tennessee territory.

New York quickly found themselves in a 10–0 hole after their first three possessions ended in two interceptions—one in the end zone—and a missed 53-yard field goal by Tynes. Toward the end of the first half, Tynes made a 50-yard field goal which the Giants followed up with a 10-yard Bradshaw touchdown run. But on their first drive of the second half, Bradshaw committed a chop block penalty in the end zone for a Tennessee safety. Tennessee quarterback Vince Young connected with Kenny Britt for a 13-yard touchdown on the ensuing drive, and the Titans never looked back. The Giants' next two possessions ended in a Bradshaw fumble and another Tynes miss, this one from 44 yards. The Titans added a Rob Bironas field goal and a Chris Johnson touchdown on their way to victory.

Week 4: vs. Chicago Bears

This Sunday night featured the introduction of the Giants' Ring of Honor, which included 30 historic players, coaches, and administrators. The presence of such defensive greats as Jessie Armstead and Michael Strahan in the stadium that night is credited with inspiring Perry Fewell's struggling defensive squad.

The New York defense held the Bears to zero points, two first downs, and 22 yards of total offense in the first half, and sacked Jay Cutler nine times before knocking him out of the game with a concussion. In total, the Bears put together only six first downs (one by penalty) and finished with the lowest final score of any Giants visitor since the Eagles in 2007. The Bears went on to lose backup quarterback Todd Collins to a hard Michael Boley tackle; third-string quarterback Caleb Hanie was called upon to play the fourth quarter. Justin Tuck and Osi Umenyiora were each responsible for three sacks on the night.

Manning and the Giants offense had their own difficulties putting points on the board, but second-half touchdowns by Bradshaw and Jacobs proved enough to win this defensive struggle. Nicks also had a notable day, catching eight passes for 110 yards.

Week 5: at Houston Texans

The upstart 3–1 Texans were slightly favored in this matchup, but the Giants took control of the game right away. They scored touchdowns on three consecutive drives in the first half, including two Nicks receptions of 6 and 12 yards. This was Nicks' second consecutive 100-yard receiving game, and he was now among the top 10 receivers league-wide in receptions, receiving yards, receptions of 20+ yards, and receiving touchdowns for the season. Jacobs also contributed a 1-yard touchdown run in the first quarter. In the third quarter, former Giant Derrick Ward provided Houston with their first touchdown of the day, but the newly dominant Giants defense did not allow any further damage. Smith's 4-yard reception late in the fourth quarter sealed the victory for the Giants.

Week 6: vs. Detroit Lions

Hoping to increase their winning streak the Giants played at home ground for an NFC duel with the Lions. In the first quarter the Giants trailed early as QB Shaun Hill made a 14-yard TD pass to WR Nate Burleson. They replied when RB Brandon Jacobs got a 4-yard TD run. They took the lead with QB Eli Manning making a 33-yard TD pass to WR Mario Manningham. The lead was cut when kicker Jason Hanson nailed a 50-yard field goal. The Giants continued to score in the 3rd quarter with Manning finding TE Travis Beckum on a 1-yard TD pass. The Lions responded in the 4th quarter with QB Drew Stanton completing an 87-yard TD pass to WR Calvin Johnson, but the Giants pulled away with Jacobs making a 6-yard TD run. The Lions tried to rally but only came away with another 50-yard field goal by Hanson giving the Giants the win.

With the win, the Giants improved to 4–2.

Week 7: at Dallas Cowboys

Turnovers had been a nagging problem for the Giants all year, and it seemed their first division game of 2010 would be no exception; their first two drives ended in interceptions off receivers' hands, giving the struggling Cowboys an early 10–0 lead. The Giants finally got on the board late in the first quarter courtesy of a 7-yard Nicks reception. Following a Giants fumble in the second quarter, Dallas quarterback Tony Romo was hit hard by linebacker Michael Boley and left the game with a clavicle fracture (Notably, Romo was the fifth quarterback the Giants defense knocked out of a game this year, after Moore, Cutler, Collins, and Hill). After Cowboys kick returner Dez Bryant returned a Dodge punt 93 yards for a touchdown, the Giants scored two consecutive touchdowns; an 8-yard pass to Nicks and a 14-yard pass to Smith.

The Giants opened the second half with two more back-to-back touchdowns; a 25-yard pass to Manningham and a 30-yard Jacobs run. The Dallas offense, now led by veteran quarterback Jon Kitna, showed signs of life in the fourth quarter as Bryant caught two 15-yard touchdown passes. But two failed onside kicks allowed the Giants to log their third straight win over their divisional foes and the fourth win of their current  streak. New York went into their bye week tied for the best record in the NFC.

Week 9: at Seattle Seahawks

Seattle quarterback Charlie Whitehurst's first career start was one to forget; the Giants defense held Matt Hasselbeck's backup to just 113 passing yards in New York's biggest win of the year to this point. The Giants scored 38 unanswered points in the first three-quarters, including touchdowns by four players; two Bradshaw runs, a 46-yard pass to Nicks, and short touchdown passes to Smith and Boss. Whitehurst finally recorded his first NFL touchdown pass in the fourth quarter, connecting on a 36-yard pass to receiver Ben Obomanu. But the Giants put together a 13-minute drive, in which all snaps were taken by Sage Rosenfels, to take nearly all the remaining time off the clock. The Giants had earned their first win at Seattle since 1981, and extended their winning streak to five games.

Week 10: vs. Dallas Cowboys

A power outage that disrupted play in the third quarter served as a fitting metaphor for the Giants' general lack of power on the field this night. Smith was sidelined by a torn pectoral muscle suffered during practice, and backup receiver Ramses Barden saw his season come to an end during this game by way of a torn Achilles tendon. Former Giant Jason Garrett was making his head coaching debut for a Cowboys team revitalized by the firing of head coach Wade Phillips one week earlier.

The Dallas defense held the Giants to just 6 points in the first half, aided by cornerback Bryan McCann's 101-yard "pick 6" from his own end zone. In a dimly lit third quarter, after a bank of lights went dark, Felix Jones extended the Cowboys' lead to 20 points on a 71-yard touchdown reception. Only after a total blackout caused an eight-minute play stoppage did Manning finally put the Giants' first touchdown on the board, in the form of a 5-yard pass to Manningham. The teams continued to trade touchdowns; a 24-yard pass from Kitna to Austin was followed by a 35-yard reception by Boss. But the Giants' turnover problem resurfaced in the fourth quarter, where a fumble and an interception ended up costing them any chance at a comeback.

Week 11: at Philadelphia Eagles

The Eagles were coming off their highest-scoring game of the year, having put up 59 points against the Redskins on Monday night. By contrast, this Sunday night game was a defensive struggle in which the Giants held the normally speedy Michael Vick to 34 rushing yards and no passing touchdowns.

After Vick scored the first points of the game on a 4-yard run, the focus moved to the defenses and the kicking games. The Giants defense saved their offense from two-second-quarter turnovers by forcing several David Akers field goal attempts, blocking one to end the first half. After losing Ellis Hobbs to a neck injury sustained on the second-half kickoff, Philadelphia put together a drive that consumed more than eight minutes of clock, but were still held to another Akers field goal. The Giants' offense finally came to life on the next drive, as Manning connected with Beckum for a short touchdown. In the fourth quarter, Umenyiora forced the Eagles' first turnover of the year, stripping the ball away from Vick to set up backup receiver Derek Hagan's first touchdown catch of the year (Hagan had been cut by the Giants prior to the season, but was re-signed the week before, after the extent of Barden's injury became apparent). Later, on a fourth down play, Eagles rusher LeSean McCoy ran for a 50-yard touchdown, which wide receiver Jason Avant followed with a two-point conversion catch. Unfortunately, as was the case last week in East Rutherford, the Giants thwarted their own comeback attempt with turnovers, committing three in the last five minutes of the game (including an interception which Philadelphia's Asante Samuel fumbled right back to the Giants). The crusher was a fourth-down play on which Manning successfully rushed for the first down but fumbled while sliding headfirst; by rule, had he slid feet-first, the play would have been over and no fumble could have occurred. The Eagles turned the gift fumble into a game-clinching field goal.

Week 12: vs. Jacksonville Jaguars

Coach Coughlin's former team dominated the Giants in 2006, when he faced them for the first time. For this rematch, the Giants were without their two star receivers; Smith's pectoral injury caused him to miss his third game, while Nicks underwent treatment for compartment syndrome caused by a leg injury in Philadelphia. The Giants had signed Michael Clayton during the week to bolster their receiving situation, but he saw little action in this game.

For the first three-quarters, the Jaguars' defense held the Giants to three Tynes field goals; this was now the third straight game in which the Giants were held to 6 points or fewer in the first half. Rashad Jennings and David Garrard provided Jacksonville with two rushing touchdowns to take a 17–6 lead at halftime. The offense finally came to life at the end of the third quarter, when big plays by Jacobs and Boss set up a 26-yard Manningham touchdown reception followed by a two-point Bradshaw run. Later in the fourth quarter, Manning led the Giants down the field on a 6-play, 61-yard drive, culminating in a go-ahead 32-yard touchdown catch by Boss. The Jaguars threatened a comeback, and even made it into New York territory after the two-minute warning. But Justin Tuck, Antrel Rolle, Jason Pierre-Paul, and Terrell Thomas combined to sack Garrard on three consecutive plays, the last of which resulted in a fumble that was recovered by Rolle. The Giants had won their first turnover-free game of 2010, and tied the Eagles for the division lead.

Week 13: vs. Washington Redskins

The Giants needed this division win to keep pace with the Eagles, and they had no trouble getting it. The rushing duo of Bradshaw and Jacobs combined for 200 yards and all four touchdowns (two each) as high winds discouraged Manning's passing game. For the first time this year, the Giants scored on each of their first two drives, taking a 14-point lead before the Redskins even managed a first down. From that point, the New York defense dominated, forcing six fumbles, recovering four, and intercepting two Donovan McNabb passes. Former Redskin Devin Thomas made an impact in his Giants debut by blocking a Hunter Smith punt to set up Tynes' field goal and wrap up a crucial win. Notably, the Giants now were 3–1 all-time against potential Hall of Fame coach Mike Shanahan.

Week 14: at Minnesota Vikings

Originally scheduled for 1 pm. EST on Sunday, December 12, this game was moved to Monday night after severe blizzard conditions in the Minneapolis-St. Paul area that forced the Giants to spend the night in Kansas City after their flight was diverted, while the operators of the Hubert H. Humphrey Metrodome asked for more time to clear all the snow from the stadium's bubbled roof. The roof later collapsed, forcing the NFL to use Ford Field in Detroit as an alternate site. The game aired on WNYW in New York City, WXXA-TV in Albany, and KMSP-TV in Minneapolis-St. Paul, along with the Fox affiliates in Duluth, Mankato and Rochester. But even the disaster in Minneapolis was overshadowed by another major headline: Vikings quarterback Brett Favre was listed as inactive for this game, ending his historic streak of 297 consecutive starts. Tarvaris Jackson, who was 2–0 in his career against the Giants, started in Favre's place.

Once again, the Giants drew strength from their running game, as Jacobs and Bradshaw combined for 219 yards rushing and two touchdowns. In the second quarter, Jacobs created his longest play of the season, a 73-yard run that set up his own short touchdown. After a by-now-typical shaky start from Manning that involved two interceptions, Manning closed out the first half with a 6-yard touchdown pass to Boss (Incidentally, news about another streak was lost in the talk about Favre: Manning was making his 100th consecutive start tonight). Bradshaw's touchdown came in the third quarter, on a 48-yard run that was also his longest of the season. The New York defense had an especially memorable night, holding the normally dominant Adrian Peterson to his lowest rushing output of the year, a paltry 26 yards. Umeniyora, Barry Cofield, Rocky Bernard, Dave Tollefson, and Jonathan Goff combined for four sacks, and Keith Bulluck contributed an interception.

Unfortunately, the injury bug hit the Giants again in several key places. Special-teamer Clint Sintim's season ended with a torn ACL, and Bradshaw and Manningham both left the game early with injuries to the forearm and hip flexor, respectively. Diehl, Nicks, and Smith returned from their injuries, but Smith suffered a new injury to his hamstring. Whether these players will be available for the crucial division game in Week 15 has yet to be determined.

With this win, the Giants rose to 9–4 and ensured that they would improve on the previous season's record of 8–8.

Week 15: vs. Philadelphia Eagles

Coming off their win over the Vikings the Giants played on home ground for an NFC East rivalry rematch against the Eagles. The Giants suffered their worst loss of the season, blowing a 31-10 fourth-quarter lead and allowing a punt return for a touchdown as time expired in regulation.

In the first quarter the Giants took the early lead as QB Eli Manning completed a 35-yard TD pass to WR Mario Manningham. The Eagles responded in the second quarter with kicker David Akers getting a 34-yard field goal, but the Giants extended their lead after Manning found Manningham on a 33-yard TD pass, followed by kicker Lawrence Tynes nailing a 25-yard field goal, then with Manning getting an 8-yard TD pass to WR Hakeem Nicks. The Eagles cut the lead with QB Michael Vick making an 8-yard TD pass to WR Jeremy Maclin, but the Giants scored with Manning finding TE Kevin Boss on an 8-yard TD pass. However, they failed to maintain this lead with Vick making a 65-yard TD pass to TE Brent Celek, followed by his 4-yard scramble for a touchdown and then his 13-yard TD pass to Maclin to tie the game at 31. After the Giants went three and out Matt Dodge's punt was returned 65 yards for a touchdown by DeSean Jackson, giving the Giants a loss, and thus bringing their record down to 9–5. In calling the final play, Fox commentator Joe Buck said:

Eagles broadcasters Merrill Reese and Mike Quick called the play on WYSP-FM in Philadelphia this way:

Week 16: at Green Bay Packers

Hoping to rebound from their loss to the Eagles the Giants flew to Lambeau Field for an NFC duel with the Packers. In the first quarter the Giants trailed early with QB Aaron Rodgers completing an 80 and a 3-yard TD pass to WR Jordy Nelson and to WR James Jones respectively. The Giants replied to tie the game with QB Eli Manning throwing a 36 and an 85-yard TD pass to WR Hakeem Nicks and Mario Manningham. They had further problems with FB John Kuhn getting an 8-yard TD run, followed by kicker Mason Crosby getting a 31-yard field goal. The Giants cut the lead with kicker Lawrence Tynes nailing a 38-yard field goal, but fell further behind with Rodgers completing a 1 and a 5-yard TD run to TE Donald Lee and to Kuhn respectively. This was followed by Kuhn getting a 1-yard TD run.

With the loss, the Giants fell to 9–6.

Week 17: at Washington Redskins

Hoping to clinch a playoff spot the Giants bused to FedExField for a division rivalry rematch against the Redskins. The Giants took the lead as kicker Lawrence Tynes hit a 20-yard field goal. This was followed by Brandon Jacobs getting a 2-yard TD run. The lead was narrowed when QB Rex Grossman threw a 1-yard TD pass to TE Fred Davis, but the Giants extended their lead with QB Eli Manning connecting to Mario Manningham on a 92-yard TD pass. The lead was narrowed in the 4th quarter as Grossman completed a 64-yard TD pass to WR Anthony Armstrong, but the Giants defense held them on for the win.

Despite the win, the Giants failed to make the playoffs after Green Bay defeated Chicago. The Giants finished their regular season with a 10–6 record.

John Mara announced Tom Coughlin would return as head coach next season.

References

External links

New York Giants seasons
New York Giants
New York Giants season
21st century in East Rutherford, New Jersey
Meadowlands Sports Complex